Dimethyldioctadecylammonium chloride also commonly distearyl dimethyl ammonium chloride is an organic compound classified as quaternary ammonium salt.  The nitrogen center substituted with two methyl groups and two stearyl groups.  The combination of long-chain hydrocarbon groups and the cationic ammonium confers surfactant- or a detergent-like properties. For professional use only, it can be found in many wares-and-equipment sanitizers as well as cleaner/sanitizer combinations that are standard in the foodservice industry – it was once a major component of fabric softeners, but has been largely phased out because of its low biodegradability.  In household products, it may also be found as an ingredient in cosmetics and hair conditioners in which it is added primarily for its antistatic effects.  It is also used in organic synthesis as a phase transfer catalyst to increase reaction rates in a two-phase organic-water system.

See also
 Dimethyldioctadecylammonium bromide – corresponding bromide salt
 Didecyldimethylammonium chloride – shorter di-C10 analogue

References

Quaternary ammonium compounds
Cationic surfactants
Household chemicals
Laundry substances